Sir Francis Watson (7 January 1864 – 27 August 1947) was a British Conservative Party politician.  He was Member of Parliament (MP) for the Pudsey and Otley division of the West Riding of Yorkshire from 1923 until retired from the House of Commons at the 1929 general election.

References

External links 
 

1864 births
1947 deaths
Knights Bachelor
Conservative Party (UK) MPs for English constituencies
UK MPs 1923–1924
UK MPs 1924–1929